In enzymology, a glucose-1-phosphate phosphodismutase is an enzyme that catalyzes the chemical reaction

2 D-glucose 1-phosphate  D-glucose + D-glucose 1,6-bisphosphate

Hence, this enzyme has one substrate, D-glucose 1-phosphate, and two products, D-glucose and D-glucose 1,6-bisphosphate.

This enzyme belongs to the family of transferases, specifically those transferring phosphorus-containing groups (phosphotransferases) with an alcohol group as acceptor.  The systematic name of this enzyme class is D-glucose-1-phosphate:D-glucose-1-phosphate 6-phosphotransferase. This enzyme participates in glycolysis / gluconeogenesis and starch and sucrose metabolism.

References

 
 

EC 2.7.1
Enzymes of unknown structure